Inverell is a large town in northern New South Wales, Australia, situated on the Macintyre River, close to the Queensland border. It is also the centre of Inverell Shire. Inverell is located on the Gwydir Highway on the western slopes of the Northern Tablelands. It has a temperate climate.

History
Prior to white colonisation, the Gamilaraay Nation (commonly known as Kamilaroi) of Aboriginal peoples lived in and occupied this region. In 1848, Alexander Campbell held the  Inverell Station on the Macintyre River. The name derives from the name of Mr. MacIntyre's estate. The word is of Gaelic origin, and signifies "meeting place of the swans"; from "Inver", a meeting place, and "Ell", a swan.

The MacIntyre River and Swanbrook Creek join here. The area was also known as "Green Swamp" in the 1850s. Wheat growers, Colin and Rosanna Ross established a store there in 1853, when he asked that a town be surveyed. In 1858, this was done and in the following years the plan was approved and the first land sale was held. Byron Post Office (open since 1855) was replaced by the Inverell Post Office on 15 September 1859. The municipality was proclaimed in March 1872. The last section of the Inverell branchline, from Delungra to Inverell, was opened on 10 March 1902. The last train ran to Inverell on 22 June 1987, and the Delungra to Inverell section of the line was closed on 2 December 1987.

In 1871, the population of Inverell was 509, this increased to 1,212 in 1881. After Federation, the population of Inverell was 1,230 in 1911, and grew to 6,530 (1947) and 8,209 (1961 census).

Myall Creek Massacre 
The massacre of at least 28 Wirrayaraay people by European convicts and settlers took place at Myall Creek near Inverell on 10 June 1838 was notable in that it was one of the very rare cases in colonial Australia for which white people were subsequently executed for the murder of Indigenous people. The crime became known as the Myall Creek Massacre. On 18 December 1838, seven men were publicly hanged at the Sydney Gaol for the atrocity.

Every year on the Sunday of the June long weekend, hundreds of people, both Indigenous and non-Indigenous, gather at the Myall Creek Massacre and Memorial Site to attend an annual memorial service.

Mining
Diamonds were discovered at Copes Creek in 1875 and were mined at Copeton from 1883 to 1922. Commercial sapphire mining was commenced in 1919 at Frazers Creek near Inverell. Rich alluvial deposits in streams were worked initially by hand miners, but this ceased in the 1930s due to the economic effects of the Great Depression. There was little recorded production up until approximately 1960, when commercial sapphire mining resumed due to a worldwide sapphire shortage. During the 1970s there were over 100 active mining operations in the New England region, however this number declined significantly in the 1980s due to weakening demand and exhaustion of the previously rich alluvial sources. Currently there are only a small number of commercially active mines in  the area.

Heritage listings 
Inverell has a number of heritage-listed sites, including:
 56 Byron Street: Inverell Shire Council Building
 97 Otho Street: Inverell Post Office
 Flepper Place

Population
According to the 2016 census of Population, there were 11,660 people in Inverell.
 Aboriginal and Torres Strait Islander people made up 9.5% of the population. 
 86.0% of people were born in Australia. The most common countries of birth were Philippines 1.4% and England 1.2%.   
 89.8% of people spoke only English at home. 
 The most common responses for religion were Anglican 28.8%, Catholic 22.9% and No Religion 20.2%.

Industry
The Inverell district is in a fertile agricultural region which produces a wide range of crops, including wheat, barley, oats, sorghum, wine grapes and maize. There are also some mining activities with tin, sapphires, zircons and diamonds (mainly industrial) being found.  Inverell is known as the "Sapphire City" because of the sapphires that have been found throughout the local district, which contributed a significant amount of Australia's sapphire production in the 1970s.

Copeton Dam, the region's main water supply, was completed in 1976. While being smaller than Sydney Harbour, it can hold nearly 2 times the capacity of Port Jackson (Sydney Harbour). The Inland Fishing Festival is held there every year.

Culture and tourism
The Grafton to Inverell Cycle Classic is an annual one day cycling race. Beginning in Grafton, passing through Glen Innes and finishing in Inverell, the Classic is a 230 km ride over the demanding Gibraltar Range. The race starts at 23 metres above sea level and climbs to 1260 metres, before finishing in Inverell at 630 metres. The race is six to seven hours long, depending on weather conditions.  Inverell is home to the Bruderhof, an Anabaptist community who share all their possessions. They run a publishing business.

The National Transport Museum comprises more than 120 vehicle exhibits ranging from vintage, veteran, classic and motorcycles in a purpose-built structure on Rifle Range Road.

Inverell is the last place in Australia to have a Coles New World supermarket. It has resisted external pressure to rename the supermarket since the early 90s.

Education
There are two primary schools in Inverell; Ross Hill School and Inverell Public School. The two local high schools are Inverell High School and Macintyre High School. Holy Trinity School is a Roman Catholic School in Inverell which caters for students from Kindergarten to Year Ten.

Transport
Inverell is served by Inverell Airport.

Inverell lies on the Gwydir Highway, one of the primary east–west routes through New South Wales. Thunderbolts Way terminates at Copes Creek, 16 km south of the Gwydir Highway intersection at Inverell.

Bus services in Inverell are provided by Inverell Bus Service, which operates two town loops, to the east and west. Interurban bus service is provided by Symes Coaches to Glen Innes.

NSW TrainLink operates three Coach services in and out of Inverell: between Moree and Grafton, between Inverell and Tamworth via Manilla and between Inverell and Armidale via Tingha.

Sports
The most popular sport in Inverell is Rugby league. The local team are the Inverell RSM Hawks, who compete in the Group 19, playing out of Varley Oval. The club has won six first grade titles in the competition and its predecessor, Group 5, with the last coming in 2016. The club has produced numerous National Rugby League players, including Owen Craigie and Phil and Chris Bailey.

Other sports teams include the Inverell Highlanders RUFC and Inverell Saints AFC.

Climate and weather

Inverell, like most of the North West Slopes features a textbook subtropical climate with a marked summer peak in rainfall. The town is located on the boundary region between the cool, wet Northern Tablelands of the Great Dividing Range and the hot, dry plains of Outback New South Wales, having climate characteristics of both regions.

In September 1892, the town had its biggest snowfall, with  falling. On 5 August 1923, snow fell in parts of the Inverell district.

Over the years, Inverell has had three weather stations run by government astronomers (prior to 1908) or the Bureau of Meteorology (after 1908), or both.  These stations are:
 Inverell Comparison (began observations in 1874, ceased observations in November 1997)
 Inverell Research Centre (began observations in 1949, still operational; converted to an Automatic Weather Station in recent years)
 Inverell (Raglan Street) (began observations in March 1995, still operational; observations done by human observer)

Notable people
Notable people from or who have lived in Inverell include:

 Chris Bailey (born 1982), a professional rugby league player who played for Newcastle Knights, Manly Sea Eagles, London Broncos, and  Huddersfield Giants.
 Phil Bailey (born 1980), former professional rugby league player for the Manly Sea Eagles, Northern Eagles, Cronulla Sharks, and Wigan Warriors.
 Owen Craigie (born 1978), former professional rugby league player for the Newcastle Knights, Wests Tigers, South Sydney Rabbitohs, and Widnes Vikings.
 Lucien Lawrence Cunningham (1889–1948), Farmer and politician 
 Steve Elkington (born 1962), professional golfer, 1995 US PGA Champion.
 Susan Hampton (born 1949), poet, winner of the Judith Wright Award
 Heinrich Haussler (born 1984), professional cyclist
 George Kneipp (1922–1993), a judge of the Supreme Court of Queensland in Townsville, Queensland (1969–1992)
 Colin Madigan (1921–2011), notable Australian architect
 Rick McCosker (born 1946), cricketer and Wisden Cricketer of the Year in 1976
 Leon Punch (1928–1991), former Deputy Premier of New South Wales
 Ivan Sen (born 1971), filmmaker
 Leo Senior (1887–1975), former professional rugby league player for the South Sydney Rabbitohs
 Scott Sunderland (born 1966), former professional cyclist. 
 Nathan Tinkler (born 1976), former mining magnate and businessman
 John Williams (born 1955), NSW Nationals Senator

References

External links

Inverell Online
VisitNSW.com – Inverell

Towns in New South Wales
Towns in New England (New South Wales)
1856 establishments in Australia
Inverell Shire
Mining towns in New South Wales